In probability theory and statistics, the Dirichlet process (DP) is one of the most popular Bayesian nonparametric models. It was
introduced by Thomas Ferguson as a prior over probability distributions.

According to the Bayesian paradigm these parameters should be chosen based on the available prior information on the domain.

The question is: how should we choose the prior parameters  of the DP, in particular the infinite dimensional one , in case of lack of prior information?

the name of Bayesian bootstrap by Rubin; in fact it can be proven that the Bayesian bootstrap is asymptotically equivalent to the frequentist bootstrap introduced by Bradley Efron.
The limiting Dirichlet process  has been criticized on diverse grounds. From an a-priori point of view, the main
criticism is that taking  is far from leading to a noninformative prior.
Moreover, a-posteriori, it assigns zero probability to any set that does not include the observations.

The imprecise Dirichlet process has been proposed to overcome these issues. The basic idea is to fix  but do not choose any precise base measure .

More precisely, the imprecise Dirichlet process (IDP) is defined as follows:

 

where  is the set of all probability measures. In other words, the IDP is the set of all Dirichlet processes (with a fixed ) obtained
by letting the base measure  to span the set of all probability measures.

Inferences with the Imprecise Dirichlet Process 

 

 

Hence,  it follows
that 
Therefore, for any fixed , we can exploit the previous equations to derive prior and posterior expectations.

In the IDP  can span the set of all distributions . A way to characterize inferences for the IDP is by computing lower and upper bounds for the expectation of  w.r.t. .
A-priori these bounds are:
 

A-posteriori, IDP can learn from data.

To define the IDP, the modeler has only to choose  (the concentration parameter). This explains the meaning of the adjective near in prior near-ignorance,  because the IDP requires by the modeller the elicitation of a parameter. However, this is a simple elicitation problem for a nonparametric prior, since we only have  to choose the value of a positive scalar (there are not infinitely many parameters left in the IDP model).

where . In other words, the IDP is consistent.

Choice of the prior strength   
Since the value of  determines how quickly lower and upper posterior expectations converge at the
increase of the number of observations,  can be chosen so to match a certain convergence rate.
The parameter  can also be chosen to have some desirable frequentist properties (e.g.,  credible intervals to be
calibrated frequentist intervals, hypothesis tests to be calibrated for the Type I error, etc.), see Example: median test

Example: estimate of the cumulative distribution 
Let  be i.i.d. real random variables with cumulative distribution function .

Since , where  is the indicator function, we can use

 

where  is the empirical distribution function.  Here, to obtain the lower we have exploited the fact that  and for the upper that .

Example: median test 
By considering the partition  and the property of the Dirichlet process, it can be shown that

 

where  is the number of observations that are less than zero,

  and 

By exploiting this property, it follows that

where  is the regularized incomplete beta function.
We can thus perform the hypothesis test

 if only one of the inequality is satisfied (which has necessarily to be the one for the upper), we are in an indeterminate situation, i.e., we cannot decide;

IDP returns an indeterminate decision when the decision is prior dependent (that is when it would depend on the choice of ).

By exploiting the relationship between the cumulative distribution function of the Beta distribution, and  the cumulative distribution function of a random variable Z from a binomial distribution, where the "probability of success" is p and the sample size is n:

we can show that the median test derived with th IDP for any choice of  encompasses the one-sided frequentist
sign test as a test for the median.

Applications of the Imprecise Dirichlet Process
Dirichlet processes are frequently used in Bayesian nonparametric statistics. The Imprecise Dirichlet Process
can be employed instead of the Dirichlet processes in any application in which prior information is lacking (it is therefore important to model this state of prior ignorance).

In this respect, the Imprecise Dirichlet Process has been used for nonparametric hypothesis testing, see the Imprecise Dirichlet Process statistical package.
Based on the Imprecise Dirichlet Process, Bayesian nonparametric near-ignorance versions of the following classical nonparametric estimators 
have been derived: the Wilcoxon rank sum test and the Wilcoxon signed-rank test.

A Bayesian nonparametric near-ignorance model presents several advantages with respect to a traditional approach to hypothesis testing.

 The Bayesian approach allows us to formulate the hypothesis test as a decision problem. This means that we can verify the evidence in favor of the null hypothesis and not only rejecting it and take decisions which minimize the expected loss.
Because of the nonparametric prior near-ignorance, IDP based tests allows us to start the hypothesis test with very weak prior assumptions, much in the direction of letting data speak for themselves.
Although the IDP test shares several similarities with a standard Bayesian approach, at the same time it embodies a significant change of paradigm when it comes to take decisions. In fact the IDP based tests have the advantage of producing an indeterminate outcome when the decision is prior-dependent. In other words, the IDP test suspends the judgment when the option which minimizes the expected loss changes depending on the Dirichlet Process base measure we focus on.
It has been empirically verified that when the IDP test is indeterminate, the frequentist tests are virtually behaving as random guessers. This surprising result has practical consequences in hypothesis testing. Assume that we are trying to compare the effects of two medical treatments (Y is better than X) and that, given the available data, the IDP test is indeterminate. In such a situation the frequentist test always issues a determinate response (for instance I can tell that Y is better than X), but it turns out that its response is completely random, like if we were tossing of a coin. On the other side, the IDP test acknowledges the impossibility of making a decision in these cases. Thus, by saying "I do not know", the IDP test provides a richer information to the analyst. The analyst could for instance use this information to collect more data.

Categorical variables
For categorical variables, i.e., when  has a finite number of elements, it is known that
the Dirichlet process reduces to a Dirichlet distribution.
In this case, the Imprecise Dirichlet Process reduces to the Imprecise Dirichlet model proposed by Walley as a model for prior (near)-ignorance for chances.

See also
Imprecise probability

Robust Bayesian analysis

References

External links 
Open source implementation of hypothesis tests based on the IDP
The imprecise probability group at IDSIA

Nonparametric Bayesian statistics